"It's Your Call" is a song written by Liz Hengber, Bruce Burch and Shawna Harrington-Burkhart, and recorded by American country music artist Reba McEntire.  It was released in May 1993 as the third and final single and title track from her album, It's Your Call. The song reached #5 on the Billboard Hot Country Singles & Tracks chart in July 1993.

Music video
The video for this song was directed by Jon Small. Compared to many other of Reba's videos of the time, the video for this song is very simple, showing Reba performing the song under many blue strobe lights.

Chart performance

Year-end charts

References

1993 singles
1993 songs
Reba McEntire songs
Songs written by Liz Hengber
Song recordings produced by Tony Brown (record producer)
MCA Records singles
Songs written by Bruce Burch
Songs about telephone calls